The Tamil Nadu State Film Award for Best Dialogue Writer is given by the state government as part of its annual Tamil Nadu State Film Awards for Tamil  (Kollywood) films.

The list
Here is a list of the award winners and the films for which they won.

See also

 Tamil cinema
 Cinema of India

References

Actor